Ralph Kaspar Rottet (February 25, 1911 – November 26, 1971) was a decorated officer and naval aviator in the United States Marine Corps with the rank of lieutenant general. A veteran of World War II, where he distinguished as commanding officer, Marine Aircraft Group 31, he later rose to through the ranks and completed his career as Deputy Chief of Staff for Plans and Programs at Headquarters Marine Corps in 1968.

Early career

Ralph K. Rottet was born on February 25, 1911, in Jasper, Indiana, as the son of cabinet maker at furniture company, John Fredrick Rottet and his wife Elisa Otilda Diendofer. His parents were of German and French descent and he was youngest of three children. Ralph attended Shelbyville High School, where he was a member of the Indiana National Guard. He graduated in 1929 and received an appointment to the United States Naval Academy at Annapolis, Maryland.

While at the Academy, Rottet was active in football, baseball and track and earned nickname "Rolo" by classmates. Many of his classmates became general officers later including Henry W. Buse Jr., John P. Condon, Victor H. Krulak, Harold O. Deakin, Frank C. Tharin, Gordon Chung-Hoon, Henry G. Sanchez, Samuel R. Shaw, and John E. Weber. He graduated on May 31, 1934, with Bachelor of Science degree and was commissioned Second lieutenant in the Marine Corps.

Following his commissioning, Rottet was ordered to the Basic School at Philadelphia Navy Yard for Marine Corps Officer instruction, which he completed in May of the following year. He was then assigned to the Marine Detachment aboard heavy cruiser Salt Lake City and took part in the patrol cruises along the coast of California and extensive gunnery exercises at San Clemente Island in early 1936. Rottet requested for flight training, which was granted and he was ordered to Naval Air Station Pensacola, Florida, in June that year.

Rottet completed his training in July 1937 and was designated naval aviator and promoted to first lieutenant. He was then ordered to the Naval Air Station San Diego, California, where he served for three years. While in that assignment, he was promoted to captain in July 1940 and transferred back to Pensacola Station in November that year. Rottet served there as an instructor for a year, before he was transferred to Washington, D.C., for duty at the Bureau of Aeronautics, Navy Department.

World War II

Following the Japanese Attack on Pearl Harbor and the United States entry into World War II, Rottet was promoted to Major in May 1942. He was ordered to Marine Corps Air Station Cherry Point, North Carolina, and joined the newly activated 3rd Marine Aircraft Wing under Brigadier general Claude A. Larkin. Rottet was appointed commanding officer of new Marine Fighting Squadron 311 attached to the Wing and was tasked with the mission of preparing squadrons for deployment and training replacement pilots for combat squadrons.

Rottet was appointed Commanding officer of newly established Marine Aircraft Group 31 (MAG-31) at Cherry Point by the end of January 1943 and later assumed capacity of Group's executive officer, when more senior Colonel Calvin R. Freeman was appointed Commanding officer in August 1943. The MAG-31 embarked for American Samoa in late September and attached to 4th Marine Aircraft Wing under Brigadier general Harold D. Campbell. Rottet was promoted to lieutenant colonel in June 1943.

The MAG-31 flew neutralization missions against many of the Japanese garrisons that had been by-passed in the Marshall Islands such as Rabaul and Rottet participated in twenty-one combat missions, flying on F4U Corsair. He took part in the strikes on Makin Atoll, Tarawa and Roi-Namur and earned Distinguished Flying Cross and three Air Medals.

Rottet assumed again the command of MAG-31 in September 1944 and under his command, the group developed an effective napalm bombing method, and conducted the first napalm bombing strikes, inflicting extensive damage on the enemy. For his service as Commanding officer, MAG-31, Rottet was decorated with Bronze Star Medal with Combat "V".

He held that assignment until December that year, when he returned to the United States after fifteen months overseas. Following his return stateside, Rottet was ordered to the Army-Navy Staff College in Washington, D.C., for an instruction. He graduated in June 1945 and was ordered to the Marine Corps Air Station Cherry Point, North Carolina, where he assumed command of Aircraft Engineering Squadron 46.

Korea and postwar service

While at Cherry Point, Rottet was appointed Assistant Chief of Staff for Operations (G-3) within Operations and Training Department there. He was ordered to Armed Forces Staff College at Norfolk, Virginia, in August 1946 and served on the faculty of the college until July 1948. Rottet was then transferred to Naval Air Station San Diego, California, and joined the staff of Commander, Air Force, Pacific Fleet as Marine Aviation Planning Officer. He served consecutively under Vice admirals Harold B. Sallada and Thomas L. Sprague and was promoted to colonel in July 1949.

In June 1950, Rottet was ordered to the Naval Air Station Minneapolis, Minnesota, where he served as Commanding officer of the Marine Air Detachment within Marine Air Reserve Training Command. He was ordered to the Headquarters Marine Corps in July 1951 and assumed duty as Head, Operations and Training Branch, Division of Aviation under Brigadier general Clayton C. Jerome.

Rottet was ordered to the Marine Corps Air Station El Toro, California, in July 1953 and completed two-month Jet indoctrination course there. Upon completion of the course, he was sent to Korea and assumed command of Marine Aircraft Group 12 attached to 1st Marine Aircraft Wing (1st MAW) under Major general Albert D. Cooley. Rottet was later transferred to command of Marine Aircraft Group 11 also attached to 1st MAW. Although the units of 1st MAW did not see much combat and took part only in patrolling along the Korean Demilitarized Zone, Rottet was decorated with Legion of Merit for his service.

In July 1954, Rottet returned to the United States and joined the staff of the Marine Corps Schools, Quantico as a member of the Advanced Research Group at the Marine Corps Educational Center, tasked with the development of recommendations on how the Marine air-ground task force should evolve structurally to meet the challenges of atomic warfare and new technologies such as helicopters and jet aircraft. He served in that capacity until June 1955, when he reported to Headquarters, Aircraft, Fleet Marine Force, Atlantic at Norfolk Navy Yard, Virginia.

Rottet was appointed Assistant Chief of Staff for Operations (G-3) of that command and served under his former superior from Division of Aviation, now Major general Clayton C. Jerome. He was promoted to the capacity of Chief of Staff of superior command, Fleet Marine Force, Atlantic under lieutenant general Alfred H. Noble in July 1956 and thus became the first aviator appointed to that position.

Following the promotion to brigadier general in July 1957, Rottet assumed command of 4th Provisional Marine Air Ground Task Force built around several units from 2nd Marine Division and 2nd Marine Aircraft Wing. He held that command until December that year, when he was ordered to Japan for duty as Assistant Commander, 1st Marine Aircraft Wing under Major general Charles H. Hayes.

In March 1959, Rottet returned to the United States and assumed duty as Commander, Marine Corps Air Bases, Eastern Area with additional duty as Commanding general, Marine Corps Air Station Cherry Point, North Carolina. While serving in this capacity, he was promoted to major general in July 1960. Three months later, Rottet was appointed Commanding general, 2nd Marine Aircraft Wing and held that assignment until October 1961, when he was transferred to Marine Corps Base Quantico for duty as Director, Marine Corps Educational Center. His main responsibility was the Education of Marine Corps officers at each stage of officer's career. 

The Marine Corps Educational Center consisted of four resident schools and one correspondce or extension school. These are known as the Basic School focused on basic training for newly commissioned officers; Junior School for second and first lieutenants; Senior School for Captain and above; Communication Officers School trained selected junior officers in the operational aspects of communications; and Extension School prepared and administered correspondence courses that parallel resident instruction.

Vietnam War period

In July 1963, Rottet was ordered back to Norfolk, Virginia, and assumed duty as Deputy Commander, Fleet Marine Force, Atlantic under lieutenant general James P. Berkeley. While in this capacity, Rottet was co-responsible for the administration of 2nd Marine Division, 2nd Marine Aircraft Wing, Camp Lejeune, and other units. He was transferred to Washington, D.C., in April 1966 and assumed duty as Marine Corps liaison officer in the Office of the Chief of Naval Operations under Admiral David L. McDonald. Rottet was decorated with his second Legion of Merit for his service in that assignment.

Rottet was promoted to lieutenant general on July 1, 1967, and assumed duty as deputy chief of staff for plans and programs at Headquarters Marine Corps. Health problems forced him to resign from the service early, and Rottet retired on September 1, 1968, after 34 years of active duty. For his service as deputy chief of staff for plans and programs, he was decorated with the Navy Distinguished Service Medal.

Death

Rottet's diagnosis was fatal, Carcinoma prostate, metastatic to bone and vicera. He settled in New Bern, North Carolina, and following a cardio-pulmonary collapse, Rottet was transported to the Naval Hospital at Camp Lejeune, North Carolina, where he died on November 26, 1971, aged 60. His body was cremated and ashes scattered over the Neuse River at his own request. He was survived by his wife, Adele Sparhawk and five children.

Decorations
Lieutenant general Rottet's  personal decorations include:

See also

Marine Corps Aviation

References

1911 births
1971 deaths
People from Jasper, Indiana
Military personnel from Indiana
United States Naval Academy alumni
United States Naval Aviators
United States Marine Corps generals
United States Marine Corps personnel of World War II
United States Marine Corps personnel of the Korean War
Recipients of the Navy Distinguished Service Medal
Recipients of the Legion of Merit
Recipients of the Distinguished Flying Cross (United States)
Recipients of the Air Medal